Herman von Klempt is a fictional supervillain created by writer/artist Mike Mignola for the Dark Horse Comics series Hellboy. He first appeared in the Comics Buyer's Guide.

Character biography
A German scientist born in 1885 Frankfurt, von Klempt displayed a keen interest in cybernetics that disturbed his family and other people, save his friend Karl Ruprecht Kroenen, while attending a Berlin medical school. The two men apparently shared similar ideas as both became members of the Sonnenrad Society, von Klempt using the organization's resources to develop the Kriegsaffe (German, "war ape"), a sort of Frankenstein's monster-like simian enforcers. In 1936, von Klempt was almost killed in a laboratory explosion that destroyed most of his body, Kroenen managing to keep von Klempt alive by placing his head in a bell jar that was later attached to a robotic body. While Kroenen later became a disciple of Rasputin, Von Klempt considered the man a fraud and refused to participate in Project Ragna Rok.

In 1939, Von Klempt participated in the Nazi Space Program where the corpse of the recently deceased physicist Ernst Oeming is offered to non-corporeal beings seeking a host with the promise of aiding the Nazis and ensure the rocket's lift-off despite interference from Lobster Johnson.

B.P.R.D.: 1946 and Comic buyer's guide

In 1946, Von Klempt retreated to a secret base on Berlin after Nazi Germany fell to the allies, intending to use the vampires of Vampir Sturm project. But a young Prof. Bruttenholm thwarted the scheme, Von Klempt escaping Europe after the war and built a laboratory under an old Portuguese prisoner in Terroso, Brazil. Von Klempt attempted to use an undead army to resurrect the Third Reich in 1952, only to be thwarted by Hellboy whom he encountered again in the jungle near Macapá, Brazil, where was prolonging his life using the spinal fluid of abducted peasant girls In the fight that ensued, Hellboy defeated von Klempt and his Kriegsaffe "Brutus". Von Klempt's inert head would not be seen for decades.

Wake the Devil
When Kroenen awakened from suspended animation with his fellow Project Ragna Rok members Ilsa Haupstein and Leopold Kurtz in 1994 by Roderick Zinco, he sent Zinco to Brazil to retrieve von Klempt's head. Once revived, von Klempt tried convincing Kroenen to abandon Rasputin's plan to awaken the Ogdru Jahad, and instead use Zinco's resources to retrieve von Klempt's projects in South America, which he promised could let them rule the world. Overhearing, Kurtz began attacking von Klempt's head, and Kroenen stabbed Kurtz in a panic. Furious at von Klempt and Kroenen, Rasputin's ghost blinded Zinco, who accidentally set off an explosion that destroyed the castle.

Conqueror Worm and B.P.R.D.: The Black Flame
Somehow surviving the castle's detonation, von Klempt's head retreated to a secret laboratory under a graveyard in Germany. There he began work on his Kriegaffe #10, but was suddenly stricken with despair over the seemingly endless failures of his life and the loss of his purpose: Hitler's Third Reich had collapsed, as had all his plans for world domination. In this moment of weakness, he was contacted by Rasputin's ghost, whom von Klempt mistakenly believed to be the Angel of Death. Rasputin reminded von Klempt of the Nazi Space Project, and showed him the destruction that would be unleashed if Dr. Oeming's capsule return to Earth with the thing that now inhabited his body was released. Von Klempt, finally given purpose - to watch the destruction of the world - returned after sixty years to Hunte Castle.

Secretly, Rasputin's aim was still the same: once the world had been overtaken, the Ogdru Hem would be released from their prisons, and they would, in turn, release the Ogdru Jahad, who would reduce the world to ashes. Von Klempt contacted his granddaughter, Inger. Believing that they were unlocking a power that would help them rule the world, Inger helped her grandfather to restore the equipment at Hunte Castle and recall Dr. Oeming's capsule to Earth.

A gigantic creature called "The Conqueror Worm" surged forth from the capsule. Spewing a noxious gas, the worm turned von Klempt's human agents into frog-men, then devoured them immediately to feed its insatiable hunger. Only quick intervention by Hellboy and Roger the Homunculus, aided by the ghost of Lobster Johnson, managed to halt the worm's march. Von Klempt was pulled off of a cliff by Roger with the madman's jar was smashed. But Von Klempt's head was retrieve by Landis Pope of the Zinco Corporation and placed among Pope's collection of Nazi memorabilia in his office. Following the intense battle between the Black Flame and Liz Sherman, von Klempt's head was spirited out of the ruins of Manhattan by Kroenen before being revived by Varvara.

In other media

Video games
 Herman von Klempt and several of his Kriegaffen are the main antagonist of the video game Hellboy: The Science of Evil voiced by renowned German actor Jürgen Prochnow.  In this game, he has a body, and is not just a disembodied head.

Toys

 Herman von Klempt's head is an accessory to the Kriegaffe #10 action figure released in 2005 by Mezco Toyz. A variant of von Klempt's head (with the Nazi swastika on his forehead) was released with a limited-edition Hellboy figure.

References 

Comics characters introduced in 1994
Hellboy characters
Fictional scientists in comics
Fictional Nazis in comics
Characters created by Mike Mignola
Fictional characters from Hesse